Marseille-en-Beauvaisis is a railway station located in the commune of Marseille-en-Beauvaisis in the Oise department, France. It is served by TER Hauts-de-France trains from Beauvais to Le Tréport-Mers. The station serves about 20,000 passengers a year. As of 2022 the station is served by 9 trains in each direction on weekdays and 3 on Sundays.

Services at the station are nowadays limited to a shelter, a ticket distributing machine and a time table. Trains cannot pass each other at the station, and there are no railway signals. The old station building is dilapidated. In the 19th century, the station was known as Marseille-le-Petit, which was the informal name of the commune at the time.

The projects

The communauté de communes de la Picardie Verte plans a modernization and renovations of parking lots at the stations in its area, and the introduction of a shared taxi service. This plan is the objective of a territorial development contract, signed by the general council of Oise in 2005.

History

See also 
 List of SNCF stations in Hauts-de-France

References

Railway stations in Oise
Railway stations in France opened in 1875